Karyat Sree Ayyappa-Bhagavathi Temple is situated in Vanimal, Vayalpeedika. The presiding deity in this temple is Lord Ayyappa. It was started as a small Bhajana Madam in the year 1987.

References

Hindu temples in Kozhikode district